The Kampala Protea Hotel is a hotel in Kampala, Uganda.

Location
The hotel is located on Elgon Terrace, off of Acacia Avenue, on Kololo Hill, in the Kampala Central Division.

Overview
The establishment, founded in 2007, is a member of the South-African based Protea Hotels Group, owned by the Marriott Hotels chain. In December 2014, the hotel won the award of "Best Luxury City Business Hotel in Uganda" in the World Luxury Hotel Awards contest that year. It had won a similar award in 2013.

According to the Uganda Tourism Board, it is a 4-star hotel.

Ownership
The hotel is a member of the Simba Group of Companies, owned by Ugandan entrepreneur Patrick Bitature, whose business interests span leisure and travel.

See also

 Kampala Capital City Authority
 List of hotels in Uganda
 List of wealthiest people in Uganda

References

Hotels in Kampala
Kampala Central Division
Hotel buildings completed in 2007
Hotels established in 2007
Hotel buildings completed in 2009
Hotels in Uganda